The Milad De Nour Tour was a professional cycling race held annually in Iran. It was part of UCI Asia Tour in category 2.2. The race was known as Tour of Milad du Nour until 2009.

Winners

References

UCI Asia Tour races
Cycle races in Iran
Recurring sporting events established in 2005
Recurring sporting events disestablished in 2011
Defunct sports competitions in Iran
2005 establishments in Iran
2011 disestablishments in Iran
Defunct cycling races in Iran